Maylín del Toro Carvajal (born 22 October 1994) is a Cuban judoka. 

She is twice gold medallist of the Pan American Judo Championships in the –63 kg category.

She represented Cuba at the 2020 Summer Olympics.

References

External links
 
 

1994 births
Living people
Cuban female judoka
Judoka at the 2015 Pan American Games
Judoka at the 2019 Pan American Games
Pan American Games gold medalists for Cuba
Pan American Games bronze medalists for Cuba
Pan American Games medalists in judo
Medalists at the 2015 Pan American Games
Medalists at the 2019 Pan American Games
Judoka at the 2020 Summer Olympics
Olympic judoka of Cuba
21st-century Cuban women